Tropical Storm Barry was a weak and short-lived tropical cyclone that brought heavy rains to parts of Central America and Mexico in June 2013. Barry originated from a tropical wave that developed in the southern Caribbean Sea. The wave tracked northwestward and began to develop in marginally favorable conditions. On June 17, the disturbance was upgraded to Tropical Depression Two by the National Hurricane Center. Due to its close proximity to land, the system failed to intensify before crossing the southern Yucatán Peninsula. The depression emerged over the Bay of Campeche late on June 18 and became increasingly organized. During the afternoon of June 19, data from Hurricane Hunters revealed the system had intensified into a tropical storm. The newly named Barry attained peak winds of 45 mph (75 km/h) before making landfall in Veracruz, Mexico on June 20. Once onshore, the storm quickly weakened and degenerated into a remnant low that night.

Areas from northern Nicaragua to South-Central Mexico experienced heavy rains from the storm, with notable flooding occurring in many areas. Swollen rivers displaced thousands in Veracruz and killed two people, while two others were killed by a river in Oaxaca. In El Salvador, one person was killed by flooding.

Meteorological history

On June 8, a tropical wave exited the west coast of Africa, moving quickly westward without development. During the evening hours of June 15, the National Hurricane Center (NHC) began monitoring a large area of disturbed weather in association with a tropical wave over the southwestern Caribbean Sea. That day, a low pressure area developed just north of Panama. Drifting west-northwest, environmental conditions were expected to be favorable for organization, but the system moved over eastern Nicaragua on June 16. Despite moving over land, the circulation and convection became better organized, and after it emerged over open waters, the system developed into Tropical Depression Two at 1200 UTC on June 17 about 25 mi (45 km) north-northwest of La Ceiba, Honduras. Located about 60 mi (95 km) east of Monkey River Town, Belize, the depression was not expected to undergo significant strengthening. Failing to intensify, the depression made landfall in southern Belize near Big Creek late on June 17 with winds estimated at 35 mph (55 km/h). Despite a waning structure, the NHC noted that if the system emerged into the Bay of Campeche, re-development and intensification was plausible.

While traversing the southern Yucatán Peninsula, the system nearly degenerated into a remnant low during the afternoon of June 18; however, as it neared water, sufficient convection redeveloped to maintain the system as a tropical depression. The circulation contracted over land and emerged into the warm waters of the Bay of Campeche that day. The system became increasingly organized as it turned westward in response to a mid-level ridge over the northwestern Gulf of Mexico. A Hurricane Hunter reconnaissance mission into the depression during the afternoon of June 19 revealed gale-force winds, prompting the NHC to upgrade and name the system Tropical Storm Barry. Based on a reconnaissance flight and Dvorak estimates, it was estimated that Barry attained peak winds of 75 km/h (45 mph) late on June 19. At 1115 UTC on June 20, Barry made landfall at Laguna La Mancha, just north of Veracruz, Mexico. Hours after moving inland, Barry weakened to a tropical depression as it interacted with the high terrain of Mexico. The center of circulation became increasingly ill defined, with the majority of convection located well away from the center. Late on June 20, Barry dissipated over the Mexican state of Puebla.

Preparations and impact

Central America and Yucatán
The precursor to Barry produced significant rains in Nicaragua, causing flooding in 14 districts in the North Caribbean Coast Autonomous Region. Several landslides occurred in Iriona, blocking off roadways. A likely tornado struck the community of Limón, destroying 9 homes and damaging 91 more. Four people were injured when their home was lifted and dropped back down. In southern Belize, an estimated  of rain fell in 24 hours, causing several rivers to top their banks. In some areas, culverts were washed away. At least 54 people living along Hope Creek were relocated to shelters. In El Salvador, six minors were swept away by a flooded creek; five were quickly rescued but one remains missing and is presumed killed. Two people were injured after being struck by lightning. More than 26,000 residents temporarily lost hydroelectric power after lightning struck a power station and caused a fire.

Eastern Mexico
As Tropical Depression Two emerged into the Bay of Campeche on June 18, the Government of Mexico issued a tropical storm watch for coastal areas between Punta El Lagarto and Barra Da Nautla. The watch was upgraded to a tropical storm warning early on June 19. Following the storm's intensification that day, the warning was expanded northward to Tuxpan. Officials dispatched 34,250 workers to set up refugee camps throughout the state. Across Veracruz, approximately 2,000 people sought refuge in shelters.

As a precautionary measure, officials urged 4,000 residents along La Antigua River to evacuate. Several landslides occurred in the states of Guerrero and Puebla. Two people were swept away by a river in Oaxaca.

See also
Other storms of the same name
Tropical Storm Harvey (2011)
Timeline of the 2013 Atlantic hurricane season
Tropical Storm Hermine (1980)

References

External links

 National Hurricane Center's advisory archive on Barry
 National Hurricane Center's graphical archive on Barry

Barry
Barry 2013
Barry 2013
Barry 2013
Barry 2013
Barry 2013
Barry